This is a list of libraries in India.

List

Resources
The National Mission on Libraries, Ministry of Culture, Government of India, has a fuller list of libraries registered with it: http://www.nmlindia.nic.in/libraryregistrations/librarylist

See also
 Open access in India

References